Borrego Pass is an unincorporated community consisting of two Navajo communities and a trading post in the Navajo lands of McKinley County, in northwestern New Mexico, United States.

Borrego Pass is located on Navajo Route 48, twelve air miles and fifteen miles by road southeast of Crownpoint.

History
The community formed around the Borrego Pass Trading Post which was opened in 1927 and was first operated by Ben and Anna Harvey, and then starting in 1935 by Bill and Jean Cousins. It was sold in 1939 to Don and Fern Smouse who operated it for over forty years. The trading post was named after the nearby Borrego Pass an ancient water gap, across the Continental Divide, that cuts into the Dutton Plateau.

Education
There is a Navajo school at Borrego Pass, the Borrego Pass School which was established in the early 1950s. In 1972, it became one of the first contract schools of the Bureau of Indian Affairs (B.I.A.).

It is in Gallup-McKinley County Public Schools. It is zoned to Crownpoint Elementary School, Crownpoint Middle School, and Crownpoint High School.

Notes

Unincorporated communities in McKinley County, New Mexico
Populated places on the Navajo Nation
Populated places established in 1927
Water gaps of the United States
Valleys of New Mexico
Unincorporated communities in New Mexico